Irvine Park is a neighborhood just west of downtown Saint Paul, Minnesota, United States, that contains a number of historic homes.  The neighborhood was platted by John Irvine and Henry Mower Rice in 1849.  At the center of the neighborhood is Irvine Park, a New England-style public square.  The neighborhood is a district listed on the National Register of Historic Places and also designated by the city as a historic district.

The neighborhood suffered for much of the twentieth century. A report on housing from the 1930s characterized the area as being

... in the less desirable rooming-house district; old homes, that at one time were mansions, but, over a period of years have been out-moded. Each successive tenant has been a little less able to pay adequate rent until the present occupants have commercialized the homes in one form or another.

In 1970, 96 percent of the neighborhood's houses were classified as substandard by the city. In the early 1970s the city planned to tear down the area and replace it with high-rise apartments for public housing. The neighborhood became a  National Register Historic District in 1973 and was named Saint Paul Heritage Preservation District in 1982.

Houses in the district

References

Further reading
Stumm, Robert J., "Irvine Park in 1854: Its Homes and the People Who Lived There 150 Years Ago'', Ramsey County History Quarterly V39 #1, Ramsey County Historical Society, St Paul, MN, 2004.

External links

Geography of Saint Paul, Minnesota
Historic districts on the National Register of Historic Places in Minnesota
Houses in Saint Paul, Minnesota
Houses on the National Register of Historic Places in Minnesota
National Register of Historic Places in Saint Paul, Minnesota